Powe House is a historic home located at Durham, Durham County, North Carolina.  It was built in 1900, and is a two-story, Neoclassical style frame dwelling with a large hip-roofed core and pedimented wings.  When built, it featured a one-story wraparound porch and an overlapping two-story portico at the central entrance bay.

It was listed on the National Register of Historic Places in 1985.

References

Houses on the National Register of Historic Places in North Carolina
Neoclassical architecture in North Carolina
Houses completed in 1900
Houses in Durham, North Carolina
National Register of Historic Places in Durham County, North Carolina